

Ernst Buffa  (14 February 1893 – 19 September 1971) was a general in the Luftwaffe of Nazi Germany during World War II. Son of Franz Freiherr Buffa von Lilienberg und Castellalt, Baron of the Holy Roman Empire, he enlisted in the German army in 1912. He entered the Military Academy of Berlin in May 1916. During World War I he was sent to the Western Front. He was also a recipient of the Knight's Cross of the Iron Cross. In 1947, he moved to Argentina where he wrote about his experiences during the war. He died in 1971 in the village of Traben-Trarbach.

Awards and decorations

 Knight's Cross of the Iron Cross on 5 September 1944 as Generalleutnant and commander of 12. Flak-Division (mot.)

References

Citations

Bibliography

 
 

1893 births
1971 deaths
People from Opole
People from the Province of Silesia
Luftwaffe World War II generals
German Army personnel of World War I
Prussian Army personnel
Recipients of the clasp to the Iron Cross, 1st class
Recipients of the Gold German Cross
Recipients of the Knight's Cross of the Iron Cross
German prisoners of war in World War II held by the United States
Reichswehr personnel
Lieutenant generals of the Luftwaffe